Gatineau is a city in Quebec, Canada.

Gatineau  may also refer to:

Places in Quebec
Gatineau (electoral district), a federal riding in the city of Gatineau
Gatineau (provincial electoral district), a provincial riding in the city of Gatineau and the Upper Gatineau Valley
Gatineau Hills, a geological formation that makes up part of the southern tip of the Canadian Shield, and acts as the northern shoulder of the Ottawa Valley
Gatineau Park, a federal park located in western Quebec on the outskirts of the city of Gatineau
Gatineau River, a river in western Quebec which joins the Ottawa River at the city of Gatineau, Quebec

Other uses
Félix Gatineau, historian and a politician in Southbridge, Massachusetts
Gatineau Privilege, a monopoly introduced to limit the cutting of timber along the Gatineau River
Microsoft Gatineau, the beta name of Microsoft adCenter Analytics
Gatineau (band), a Canadian francophone hip hop group

See also
 Gastineau (disambiguation)